Nalacetus is an extinct pakicetid early whale, fossils of which have been found in Lutetian red beds in Punjab, Pakistan (paleocoordinates ). Nalacetus lived in a fresh water environment, was amphibious, and carnivorous.
It was said to be wolf-sized and one of the earliest forms of the order Cetacea.

Nalacetus is known mostly from dental remains from the Lutetian of the Kala Chitta Hill, Punjab, Pakistan:
 H-GSP 96055, right palatal fragment with P4 and M1−2.
 H-GSP 30306, right maxillary fragment with P2 and partial P3−4; a fragmentary mandible with fragmented teeth together with some isolated lower teeth.

In the cheek teeth of Pakicetus, the protocone lobe increases from the first molar to the third. In Nalacetus, in contrast, the protocone lobe is larger in the first molar than in the second.

Notes

References

 
 

Pakicetidae
Extinct animals of Pakistan
Eocene mammals of Asia
Prehistoric cetacean genera
Fossil taxa described in 1998